The Motorchuna is a river in Yakutia (Sakha Republic), Russia. Since its river basin is uninhabited, the Motorchuna is one of the most untouched rivers in Yakutia; the waters are clean and there is abundant wildlife.    

The name of the river comes from the Even "mo/tor/chu" (мо/тор/чу), meaning "tree/pass/river". 

In the International scale of river difficulty the Motorchuna is a Class II destination for rafting and kayaking.

Course  
The  sources of the Motorchuna are north of the Polar Circle, in the northeastern slopes of the Central Siberian Plateau, very near the sources of the north-flowing Merchimden. It fringes the plateau area heading in a roughly ENE direction. In mid course it turns slightly and flows across the Central Yakutian Lowland in a roughly ESE direction forming meanders in the floodplain to the south of the Syungyude. The banks in the middle and lower reaches are bound by vertical rocky cliffs. The channel is mostly pebbly. In its last stretch the Motorchuna flows parallel to the Muna further south, in an area of lakes and marshes. Finally it meets the left bank of the Lena,  from its mouth. Its confluence is almost opposite the mouth of the Menkere on the facing bank.

The Motorchuna is fed by rain and snow. It freezes in mid-October and stays under ice until late May or early June.

Tributaries 

Flora and fauna
Thickets of golden root and Rhododendron adamsii grow on the banks on the Motorchuna. In certain places there are dense shrubs growing near the water and in the banks of the lower course there are willows. Often birds and mammals hide in the vegetation. Elk, wolf, willow ptarmigan, bean goose and greater white-fronted goose are common near the river.

The main fish species are pike, perch, lenok, taimen, grayling, burbot, whitefish and nelma, among others.

See also
List of rivers of Russia

References

External links 
Территория Якутия ч. 1(Рыбалка за Горизонтом. Лето 2019)
Территория Якутия ч. 3 (Рыбалка за Горизонтом. Март 2019)
Fishing & Tourism in Yakutia

Rivers of the Sakha Republic
Central Yakutian Lowland